Larry Yung Chi-kin or Rong Zhijian (born 31 January 1942) is a Chinese businessman and the former chairman of CITIC Pacific, a Hong Kong-based conglomerate. According to Hurun Report, he was one of the wealthiest people in mainland China, with a personal net worth of US$2.9 billion as of 2013.. He was in charge of CITIC Pacific when it made its first major loss in 20 years, US$2 billion, due to speculation in FX accumulators. This exposed the lack of internal management controls, which subsequently resulted in a temporary suspension of CITIC Pacific shares on the Hong Kong Stock Exchange and police raids at CITIC.

Biography

Early life
Yung was born in Shanghai to businessman Rong Yiren, who later became the vice president of China during the 1990s. He graduated from Shanghai Nanyang Model High School in 1959 and went on to Tianjin University, where he majored in electronic engineering.  Yung's uncle, Paul, elder brother of Yiren, died with 34 others in Hong Kong's worst air disaster on Basalt Island on 21 December 1948.

Cultural revolution
When the Cultural Revolution started, because of his capitalist background, Rong Yiren was exiled to Liangshan, in Sichuan, in 1966. After the turbulent years, he became associated with Deng Xiaoping and was later appointed vice-president of the People's Republic of China.  His family's ties to the Communist Party of China earned him the nickname "the Red Capitalist."  With the support of the Chinese government and its capital, son Larry moved to Hong Kong and started businesses with the Chinese government as major shareholder, becoming wealthy in the process.

CITIC Pacific
In 1990, Yung became chairman of CITIC Pacific, an arm of his father's company CITIC Group. He continued his work at the company until the Foreign exchange losses controversy led to his resignation on 8 April 2009.

Recent ventures
In 2007, Yung was reported to have joined the ranks of real estate speculators in Shanghai with an investment of more than one billion RMB.  In 2009, having left CITIC, he established Yung's Enterprise Holdings to pursue this line of business.

References
 
 Rong: Red Capitalist. Sina News. March 2, 2002.
 Rong: Betting One Billion on Shanghai Real Estate Sina News. March 6, 2007.

External links
 chinavitae.com: Biography
 Forbes China Rich List (November 1, 2005)
 Sina's Page On Rong Zhijian

1942 births
Living people
Billionaires from Shanghai
CITIC Group people
Hong Kong businesspeople
Business and Professionals Federation of Hong Kong politicians
Members of the Election Committee of Hong Kong, 2007–2012
Members of the National Committee of the Chinese People's Political Consultative Conference
Businesspeople from Shanghai
People's Republic of China politicians from Shanghai
Nanyang Model High School alumni
Tianjin University alumni